Brambell is an English language surname.

List of people with the surname 

 Francis Brambell (1901–1970), Irish medical scientist
 Iain Brambell (born 1973), Canadian rower
 Michael Brambell, British zoologist
 Wilfrid Brambell (1912–1985), Irish television and film actor and comedian

See also 

 Bramble
 Bramble (surname)
 Bramwell (disambiguation)

Surnames
Surnames of British Isles origin
Surnames of Irish origin
Surnames of English origin